The Volkhov constituency (No.113) is a Russian legislative constituency in Leningrad Oblast. The constituency covers most of eastern Leningrad Oblast.

Members elected

Election results

1993

|-
! colspan=2 style="background-color:#E9E9E9;text-align:left;vertical-align:top;" |Candidate
! style="background-color:#E9E9E9;text-align:left;vertical-align:top;" |Party
! style="background-color:#E9E9E9;text-align:right;" |Votes
! style="background-color:#E9E9E9;text-align:right;" |%
|-
|style="background-color: "|
|align=left|Yury Sokolov
|align=left|Independent
|
|23.44%
|-
| colspan="5" style="background-color:#E9E9E9;"|
|- style="font-weight:bold"
| colspan="3" style="text-align:left;" | Total
| 
| 100%
|-
| colspan="5" style="background-color:#E9E9E9;"|
|- style="font-weight:bold"
| colspan="4" |Source:
|
|}

1995

|-
! colspan=2 style="background-color:#E9E9E9;text-align:left;vertical-align:top;" |Candidate
! style="background-color:#E9E9E9;text-align:left;vertical-align:top;" |Party
! style="background-color:#E9E9E9;text-align:right;" |Votes
! style="background-color:#E9E9E9;text-align:right;" |%
|-
|style="background-color:"|
|align=left|Yury Belov
|align=left|Communist Party
|
|25.37%
|-
|style="background-color:"|
|align=left|Yury Sokolov (incumbent)
|align=left|Independent
|
|15.89%
|-
|style="background-color:"|
|align=left|Sergey Modestov
|align=left|Our Home – Russia
|
|14.68%
|-
|style="background:" |
|align=left|Boris Yakovlev
|align=left|Kedr
|
|12.14%
|-
|style="background-color:#D50000"|
|align=left|Andrey Markushev
|align=left|Communists and Working Russia - for the Soviet Union
|
|6.76%
|-
|style="background-color:#2C299A"|
|align=left|Yury Mishin
|align=left|Congress of Russian Communities
|
|4.62%
|-
|style="background-color:"|
|align=left|Gennady Ravdis
|align=left|Liberal Democratic Party
|
|4.16%
|-
|style="background-color:"|
|align=left|Yevgeny Tsvetkov
|align=left|Independent
|
|2.54%
|-
|style="background-color:#000000"|
|colspan=2 |against all
|
|11.71%
|-
| colspan="5" style="background-color:#E9E9E9;"|
|- style="font-weight:bold"
| colspan="3" style="text-align:left;" | Total
| 
| 100%
|-
| colspan="5" style="background-color:#E9E9E9;"|
|- style="font-weight:bold"
| colspan="4" |Source:
|
|}

1999

|-
! colspan=2 style="background-color:#E9E9E9;text-align:left;vertical-align:top;" |Candidate
! style="background-color:#E9E9E9;text-align:left;vertical-align:top;" |Party
! style="background-color:#E9E9E9;text-align:right;" |Votes
! style="background-color:#E9E9E9;text-align:right;" |%
|-
|style="background-color:#C21022"|
|align=left|Aleksandr Shimanov
|align=left|Party of Pensioners
|
|24.19%
|-
|style="background-color:"|
|align=left|Aleksandr Belyakov
|align=left|Unity
|
|15.70%
|-
|style="background-color:"|
|align=left|Yury Sevenard
|align=left|Communist Party
|
|15.41%
|-
|style="background-color:#3B9EDF"|
|align=left|Anatoly Zaytsev
|align=left|Fatherland – All Russia
|
|11.54%
|-
|style="background-color:"|
|align=left|Sergey Petrov
|align=left|Independent
|
|7.76%
|-
|style="background-color:"|
|align=left|Igor Afanasyev
|align=left|Independent
|
|4.84%
|-
|style="background-color:"|
|align=left|Vyacheslav Skvortsov
|align=left|Our Home – Russia
|
|3.59%
|-
|style="background-color:"|
|align=left|Viktor Yashin
|align=left|Liberal Democratic Party
|
|2.24%
|-
|style="background-color:"|
|align=left|Dmitry Mayatsky
|align=left|Independent
|
|0.36%
|-
|style="background-color:#000000"|
|colspan=2 |against all
|
|12.64%
|-
| colspan="5" style="background-color:#E9E9E9;"|
|- style="font-weight:bold"
| colspan="3" style="text-align:left;" | Total
| 
| 100%
|-
| colspan="5" style="background-color:#E9E9E9;"|
|- style="font-weight:bold"
| colspan="4" |Source:
|
|}

2003

|-
! colspan=2 style="background-color:#E9E9E9;text-align:left;vertical-align:top;" |Candidate
! style="background-color:#E9E9E9;text-align:left;vertical-align:top;" |Party
! style="background-color:#E9E9E9;text-align:right;" |Votes
! style="background-color:#E9E9E9;text-align:right;" |%
|-
|style="background-color:"|
|align=left|Aleksandr Shimanov (incumbent)
|align=left|United Russia
|
|31.27%
|-
|style="background-color:"|
|align=left|Andrey Siletsky
|align=left|Independent
|
|24.47%
|-
|style="background-color:#FFD700"|
|align=left|Mikhail Vodopyanov
|align=left|People's Party
|
|10.71%
|-
|style="background-color:"|
|align=left|Nikolay Kucherov
|align=left|Independent
|
|6.60%
|-
|style="background-color:"|
|align=left|Valery Grigoryev
|align=left|Liberal Democratic Party
|
|5.14%
|-
|style="background-color:"|
|align=left|Oleg Matveyev
|align=left|Yabloko
|
|3.50%
|-
|style="background-color:#1042A5"|
|align=left|Aleksandr Lupeko
|align=left|Union of Right Forces
|
|1.83%
|-
|style="background-color:#000000"|
|colspan=2 |against all
|
|14.60%
|-
| colspan="5" style="background-color:#E9E9E9;"|
|- style="font-weight:bold"
| colspan="3" style="text-align:left;" | Total
| 
| 100%
|-
| colspan="5" style="background-color:#E9E9E9;"|
|- style="font-weight:bold"
| colspan="4" |Source:
|
|}

2016

|-
! colspan=2 style="background-color:#E9E9E9;text-align:left;vertical-align:top;" |Candidate
! style="background-color:#E9E9E9;text-align:left;vertical-align:top;" |Party
! style="background-color:#E9E9E9;text-align:right;" |Votes
! style="background-color:#E9E9E9;text-align:right;" |%
|-
|style="background-color: " |
|align=left|Sergey Petrov
|align=left|United Russia
|84,066
|46.82%
|-
|style="background-color: " |
|align=left|Galina Kulikova
|align=left|A Just Russia
|26,078
|14.52%
|-
|style="background-color: " |
|align=left|Vladimir Ozherelyev
|align=left|Communist Party
|15,778
|8.79%
|-
|style="background-color:" |
|align=left|Aleksey Ponimatkin
|align=left|Liberal Democratic Party
|13,598
|7.57%
|-
|style="background:"|
|align=left|Andrey Gindos
|align=left|Communists of Russia
|6,702
|3.73%
|-
|style="background-color: " |
|align=left|Maksim Volkov
|align=left|Party of Growth
|6,234
|3.47%
|-
|style="background-color: " |
|align=left|Vladimir Mayorov
|align=left|Civic Platform
|4,370
|2.43%
|-
|style="background-color: " |
|align=left|Aleksandr Rastorguyev
|align=left|People's Freedom Party
|3,431
|1.91%
|-
|style="background-color: " |
|align=left|Svetlana Stosha
|align=left|Yabloko
|3,366
|1.87%
|-
|style="background-color: " |
|align=left|Valery Shinkarenko
|align=left|Rodina
|3,292
|1.83%
|-
|style="background:" |
|align=left|Yelena Morozenok
|align=left|The Greens
|2,992
|1.67%
|-
| colspan="5" style="background-color:#E9E9E9;"|
|- style="font-weight:bold"
| colspan="3" style="text-align:left;" | Total
| 179,564
| 100%
|-
| colspan="5" style="background-color:#E9E9E9;"|
|- style="font-weight:bold"
| colspan="4" |Source:
|
|}

2021

|-
! colspan=2 style="background-color:#E9E9E9;text-align:left;vertical-align:top;" |Candidate
! style="background-color:#E9E9E9;text-align:left;vertical-align:top;" |Party
! style="background-color:#E9E9E9;text-align:right;" |Votes
! style="background-color:#E9E9E9;text-align:right;" |%
|-
|style="background-color: " |
|align=left|Sergey Petrov (incumbent)
|align=left|United Russia
|74,467
|40.85%
|-
|style="background-color: " |
|align=left|Aleksandr Perminov
|align=left|A Just Russia — For Truth
|24,895
|13.66%
|-
|style="background-color: " |
|align=left|Vladimir Ozherelyev
|align=left|Communist Party
|20,285
|11.13%
|-
|style="background-color: " |
|align=left|Olga Baranova
|align=left|Party of Pensioners
|18,181
|9.97%
|-
|style="background:"|
|align=left|Andrey Gindos
|align=left|Communists of Russia
|12,156
|6.67%
|-
|style="background-color: " |
|align=left|Vyacheslav Dyubkov
|align=left|Liberal Democratic Party
|9,915
|5.44%
|-
|style="background-color: " |
|align=left|Sergey Tikhomirov
|align=left|Civic Platform
|4,253
|2.33%
|-
|style="background-color: " |
|align=left|Sergey Furs
|align=left|Yabloko
|3,850
|2.11%
|-
|style="background-color: " |
|align=left|Dmitry Zhvaniya
|align=left|Rodina
|3,271
|1.79%
|-
| colspan="5" style="background-color:#E9E9E9;"|
|- style="font-weight:bold"
| colspan="3" style="text-align:left;" | Total
| 182,301
| 100%
|-
| colspan="5" style="background-color:#E9E9E9;"|
|- style="font-weight:bold"
| colspan="4" |Source:
|
|}

Notes

References

Russian legislative constituencies
Politics of Leningrad Oblast